The council of the Overstrand Local Municipality in the Western Cape, South Africa is elected every five years by a system of mixed-member proportional representation. Half of the councillors are elected by first-past-the-post voting from individual wards, while the other half are appointed from party lists so that the total number of party representatives is proportional to the number of votes received. By-elections are held to replace the councillors elected by wards if a vacancy occurs.

Results 
The following table shows the composition of the council after past elections and floor-crossing periods.

December 2000 election

The Overstrand municipality was created in 2000 by merging the Hangklip-Kleinmond, Hermanus, Stanford and Gansbaai municipalities. The council consisted of 18 members, 9 elected to represent wards and 9 from party lists. The election was held on 5 December 2000; the Democratic Alliance won a majority of 12 seats.

By-elections from December 2000 to October 2002
The following by-elections were held to fill vacant ward seats in the period between the election in December 2000 and the floor crossing period in October 2002.

October 2002 floor crossing

In terms of the Eighth Amendment of the Constitution and the judgment of the Constitutional Court in United Democratic Movement v President of the Republic of South Africa and Others, in the period from 8–22 October 2002 councillors had the opportunity to cross the floor to a different political party without losing their seats.

In the Overstrand council, seven councillors departed the Democratic Alliance (DA) to become representatives of the New National Party (NNP). The NNP, which had formerly been part of the DA, then formed a coalition with the African National Congress (ANC); this coalition had a majority of 12 seats.

September 2004 floor crossing
Another floor-crossing period occurred on 1–15 September 2004. In the Overstrand council, 5 councillors crossed from the New National Party (NNP) to the African National Congress (ANC), giving the ANC a majority of 10 seats.

March 2006 election

At the elections of 1 March 2006, the council was expanded to 19 members with the addition of a new ward. The Democratic Alliance won a majority with 10 seats.

September 2007 floor crossing
The final floor-crossing period occurred on 1–15 September 2007; floor-crossing was subsequently abolished in 2008 by the Fifteenth Amendment of the Constitution. In the Overstrand council, the only representative of the African Christian Democratic Party crossed to the Democratic Alliance (DA), giving the DA an increased majority with 11 seats. The only representative of the Independent Democrats, as well as one representative of the African National Congress, crossed to the newly formed National People's Party.

By-elections from September 2007 to May 2011
The following by-elections were held to fill vacant ward seats in the period between the floor crossing period in September 2007 and the election in May 2011.

May 2011 election

At the election of 18 May 2011, the council was expanded to 25 members with the addition of 3 new wards and 3 new PR list seats. The Democratic Alliance won a majority with 15 seats.

By-elections from May 2011 to August 2016
The following by-elections were held to fill vacant ward seats in the period between the elections in May 2011 and August 2016.

August 2016 election

At the election of 3 August 2016, the Democratic Alliance won a majority with 16 seats.

By-elections from August 2016 to 2021
The following by-elections were held to fill vacant ward seats in the period between the elections since August 2016.

November 2021 election

At the election of 1 November 2021, the Democratic Alliance won a majority with 17 seats.

Notes

References

Overstrand Local Municipality
Overstrand
Elections in the Western Cape
Overstrand Local Municipality